Morris Taua Unutoa (born March 1, 1971) is a former American football offensive lineman in the National Football League, who played for the Philadelphia Eagles, Tampa Bay Buccaneers, and the Buffalo Bills.  He played college football at Brigham Young University.

References

1971 births
Living people
BYU Cougars football players
American football centers
Philadelphia Eagles players
Tampa Bay Buccaneers players
Buffalo Bills players
American sportspeople of Samoan descent
Players of American football from Torrance, California